Lotus seed paste is a Chinese dessert ingredient made from dried lotus seeds.  It is traditionally considered a luxurious ingredient.

Production
The process for making the paste is similar to that used to make smooth red bean paste. First, the dried seeds are stewed in water until soft and then mashed into a fine paste. The paste is then watered down to a thin slurry and passed through a sieve and into cheesecloth, with which it is squeezed dry. This produces a fine crumbly paste, which is then mixed with sugar or other sweeteners and often oil to produce a smooth, sweet paste.

Use

China
The lotus paste used by most Chinese cooks requires further preparation by dry cooking the sweetened paste over heat with caramelized sugar and vegetable oil. This produces a lotus paste that is tan coloured with a satiny sheen, which is rich, sweet, and silky with a slight fragrance of caramel. Some cooks choose to treat the dried lotus seeds with a lye solution before initially stewing them in order to shorten their cooking time.

Lotus paste is used in Chinese cuisine as a filling for mooncake, baozi, and other sweet pastries. Another common use of lotus paste is as a filling for lotus seed buns, a dim sum item.

Due to the higher price of lotus seeds, commercially prepared lotus pastes may also contain white kidney bean paste as a filler. There are different variations with some darker, close to black in color.  Usually these have a deeper taste.

References

See also
 Sweet bean paste

Nelumbo
Chinese desserts
Food paste